DJ Play My Blues is the sixth studio album by blues musician Buddy Guy, recorded in December 1981 and released on JSP Records in 1982. It was the third in a trio of Guy albums on JSP.

Background and recordings
One year after the release of the slicker and funkier Breaking Out, Buddy Guy and his band entered Soto Sound Studio in Chicago and recorded one of the most remarkable blues albums of the 1980s. Buddy's brother, Phil Guy, was on second guitar. Longtime drummer Ray "Killer" Allison was back again, and there were two new members in Buddy's band: guitarist Doug Williams (a member of Phil Guy's band), and bassist Mike Morrison (who had played with Junior Wells and Willie Dixon).

Releases
The original release includes only seven tracks. A 10-track LP was released in 1991 by Music Box International in Greece. Two of the three new tracks were previously released on Phil Guy's solo albums in 1982 and 1983 (The Garbage Man Blues and Mellow Down), with Phil singing the lead vocals on these songs. The 10-track version was released on a remastered CD by JSP in 1994 with an alternate cover. It was re-released on CD in 2004 (with another alternate cover), including two more tracks.

Critical reception

AllMusic gave the album four out of five stars and in the review by Chris Nickson, he commented:

Original vinyl track listing

Re-released vinyl and remastered CD track listing

CD 2004 re-release track listing

Personnel 
 Buddy Guy – guitar, vocals
 Phil Guy – guitar, vocals on "Garbage Man Blues" and "Mellow Down"
 Doug Williams – guitar
 Mike Morrison – bass
 Ray Allison – drums
Additional:
 Jerry Soto – engineer
 Martin Atkinson – mixing
 John Stedman – liner notes

Notes
All guitar solos were played by Buddy Guy on tracks 1-8 & 12. All three guitarists (Buddy, Phil Guy & Doug Williams) played solos on tracks 9 & 10.

References

1982 albums
Buddy Guy albums
JSP Records albums